Kyzyl-Jyldyz is a village in Jalal-Abad Region of Kyrgyzstan. It is part of Nooken District. Its population was 802 in 2021.

References

Populated places in Jalal-Abad Region